Bucquetia is a genus of plant in family Melastomataceae. It contains the following species:

 Bucquetia glutinosa (L.f.) DC.
 Bucquetia nigritella (Naudin) Triana
 Bucquetia vernicosa Gleason

 
Melastomataceae genera
Taxonomy articles created by Polbot
Taxa named by Augustin Pyramus de Candolle
Taxa described in 1828